The Consumer & Prescriber Grant Program (also going by other names, including Attorney General Prescriber Grant Program) was a grant program established with fines paid by Pfizer in the Franklin v. Parke-Davis trial for False Claims Act violations relating to off-label use of gabapentin.

Grant recipients
There were 24 original grant recipients.

Oregon State University 
"Education about Heavily Marketed Drugs"
PharmedOut
Federation of State Medical Boards
Robert Larner College of Medicine
The Pew Charitable Trusts
American Medical Association

References

External links
Official website archival copy from March 2011. The website existed from 2008-2011.

Grants (money)
Off-label drug use